Fireside is an unincorporated locality on the Alaska Highway in far northern British Columbia, Canada, located at the junction of the Kechika and Liard Rivers.  Muddy River Indian Reserve No. 1 is located nearby, as is an old steamer landing named Skooks.

See also
List of communities in British Columbia

References

Liard Country
Unincorporated settlements in British Columbia